All In Good Time  is the ninth studio album by Barenaked Ladies, released by Raisin' Records 23 March 2010 in Canada, and 30 March 2010 in the United States. It is the first album recorded following the departure of founding member Steven Page in February 2009, and the band's second album recorded as a four-piece (their 1996 album Born on a Pirate Ship was recorded between the departure of original keyboardist Andy Creeggan and the arrival of his replacement Kevin Hearn).

"You Run Away" was released as a single on 10 January 2010. "Every Subway Car" was released on US and Canadian iTunes on 23 February. It was later released as the second single from the album, recut as a duet with Erin McCarley.

The band had composed 27 songs, with 18 ultimately being recorded. With Page's departure, Hearn and bassist Jim Creeggan filled the void by contributing a comparatively greater share of lead vocals than on previous albums. Ed Robertson, who contributed lead vocals equally with Page, sings lead on 10 of the 18 recorded songs, while Hearn and Creeggan sing on five and three, respectively. Drummer Tyler Stewart also lent significant vocals to "Four Seconds".

Production history
After founding member Steven Page announced his departure in February 2009, the band indicating that the remaining members would continue recording and touring together as Barenaked Ladies.

The band began recording the new album with producer Michael Phillip Wojewoda on 19 May 2009, and documented their rehearsal and recording process through their Twitter account. Primary recording was done at Canterbury Studios in Toronto, with additional recording done at Jim Creeggan's home. Recording ended on 24 July, and Bob Clearmountain finished mixing the 18 recorded tracks on 30 July. The final album consisting of 13 songs (later changed to 14) was sequenced and mastered on 13 August. In August, Robertson indicated the possibility of releasing an EP composed of the songs that did not make the cut for the final album.

The band announced on 6 January 2010 that it had signed an exclusive worldwide distribution agreement with EMI Label Services through its new label Raisin' Records, which replaces its previous label, Desperation Records, used from its break with Reprise Records in 2004 until the departure of Page in 2009.

Reception

The album has received mostly positive reviews.

Release
The standard album contains fourteen tracks. This version is available in physical CD format, digital download, as well as a vinyl version made available through the band's webstore on 14 April 2010. The vinyl version, however, does not include the songs "I Have Learned" and "How Long". This was done to fit the album on one vinyl record rather than releasing as a double-LP.

Four songs were recorded but not included on the standard album: "All In Good Time", "Moonstone", "She Turned Away", and "Let There Be Light". Three of these tracks are retailer-exclusive bonus tracks, while the latter was an exclusive bonus for purchasers of concert tickets on the tours following the album's release. The band's management indicated that these tracks would ultimately be available for separate purchase after a period of time. However, as of 2017, they have not been released.

A limited edition physical version of the album is available in Canada, and is exclusively available in the United States through f.y.e. music stores (though Amazon.com offers it as an import from Canada) This edition includes a T-shirt of the cover photo and a bonus disc containing live acoustic versions of two of the album's songs from a radio performance.

Track listing

Personnel
Ed Robertson – lead vocals, acoustic and electric guitars, electric bass, drums, percussion, synthesizer, background vocals
Kevin Hearn – lead vocal on 3, 9, and 14, piano, synthesizers, keyboards, celeste, acoustic and electric guitars, mandolin, banjo, accordion, harmonica, background vocals
Jim Creegan – lead vocal on 5 and 12, double bass, electric bass, electric guitar, cello, piano, string arrangements, background vocals
Tyler Stewart – drums, percussion, background vocals

Additional musicians
Michael Phillip Wojewoda – additional vocals and percussion
Ian  LeFeuvre – guitar on 4
Jeff Nelsen – horn on 9
Erin McCarley – vocals
String quartet on 5, 12
Aya Miyagawa – 1st violin
Gregory Campbell – 2nd violin
Capella Sherwood – viola
Amy Laing – cello

Production
Production/Engineering: Michael Phillip Wojewoda
Engineering/Digital editing: Kenny Luong
Additional Engineering: Jeremy Darby
Mixing: Bob Clearmountain
Mix Assistance: Brandon Duncan
Mastering: Ted Jensen
Art Direction/Design: Chris Bellheimer
Photography: James Minchin III
Clock Photograph: Kevin Hearn
Direction: Jordan Feldstein/Rich Egan (CAM8)
Business Management: Kenna Danyliw/Mann Chartered Accountants

Singles
Two singles were released from All in Good Time. "You Run Away", the lead single, achieved moderate success, becoming the band's highest-charting song in Canada since 2000's "Pinch Me". "Every Subway Car" was released as a single, but did not chart.

Charts
All In Good Time has been relatively successful on the charts, being the band's highest charting since their 2003 album Everything to Everyone

References

External links
All in Good Time by Billboard

2010 albums
Barenaked Ladies albums
Albums produced by Michael Phillip Wojewoda